Llanvapley is a village in the community of Gobion Fawr, in Monmouthshire, south east Wales, United Kingdom. Llan has replaced the (earlier) Eglwys (1254).

Location 

Llanvapley is sited on the B4233 road, a popular route for cyclists, about four miles from Abergavenny and nine miles from Monmouth.

In standard Welsh the name of the parish is Llanfable.  In the Gwentian dialect this was Llanfaple (a "b" at the beginning of a final syllable becomes "p") (although one might expect Llanfapla, as by the 1800s a final "e" was pronounced as "a"). The form Llanvapley is the anglicised spelling of the Gwentian dialect form. A variant anglicised spelling - Llanfapley - preserves the Welsh "f" [v]. Curiously, this hybrid spelling is found in some Welsh-language texts in the 1800s. Both Llanvapley and Llanfable occur on ancient maps, documents and property deeds. The spelling Llanfapley is still used occasionally.

Amenities 

The Red Hart Inn, in the centre of the village, reopened in February 2020 after a substantial renovations and offers diverse menus and craft ales. Families are welcome and the large south facing pub garden to the rear has great views of the Llanvapley cricket ground and surrounding countryside. Extensive parking is available on site.

Llanvapley has an activecricket team and the modern cricket pavilion and village hall is run by the Llanvapley Sports & Social Association and is also used as a polling station. The site includes an excellent children's playground with tree seats and picnic benches. The Local Women's Institute meets regularly, tai chi classes are often available together with the monthly meeting Llanvapley and District Gardening Club, and village afternoon teas are held on the first Monday afternoon of each month in the pavilion, amongst other activities. Village life is very active.

Church of St Mabli is of 15th century origin, ancient yet recently sympathetically renovated using natural materials sourced locally; services are held on the second and fourth Sundays of each month. The Rev. Heidi Prince was appointed as Priest-in-Charge in 2015, having been a highly popular Rector of Llanvapley between 1997 and 2006. She was the first woman to be appointed in six centuries of worship. The church has a strong congregation and is part of a group of local parishes including Llanvetherine, Llantilio Crossenny and Penrhos. The group has a parish magazine known as The New Times which is available to download on the group website Llantilio Group website.

Llanvapley Court is the largest property in the village and was in the past a country hotel and housed the Land Army during WWII. A number of historic Welsh longhouses of architectural note can be found within the curtilage of Llanvapley, as illustrated in the Historic Houses of Monmouthshire, by Lord Raglan.

The village has strong transport links, being about a 7 minute drive and 4 miles from Abergavenny railway station with direct trains to London, Bristol, Cardiff, Swansea, Hereford, Crewe, Liverpool, Manchester and beyond.

Education provision locally is strong and free state school transport is provided by Monmouthshire County Council leaves the village at about 8am daily. The local state schools include the outstanding Monmouth Comprehensive School and Cross Ash Primary, Hereford Sixth Form College, and independent schools including Haberdashers' Monmouth Schools for boys and girls.

The village lies within the historic Three Castles area, a ten-minute drive of the historic castles of Raglan, White Castle, Skenfrith and Grosmont.

Excellent cinema is available 4 and 9 miles away, at The Baker St and Savoy cinemas respectively, the latter being the oldest working cinema in Wales.

Openreach provides super fast broadband throughout the village, averaging 70 megabytes per second and for that reason the village attracts many seeking to escape to the county whilst maintaining active careers.

References

Villages in Monmouthshire